Zabolotye is a rural locality (a village) in Nagornoye Rural Settlement, Petushinsky District, Vladimir Oblast, Russia. The population was 3 as of 2010.

Geography 
Zabolotye is located on the Sheredar River, 30 km northwest of Petushki (the district's administrative centre) by road. Panfilovo is the nearest rural locality.

References 

Rural localities in Petushinsky District